The coastal topi  (Damaliscus lunatus topi) is a highly social antelope of the genus Damaliscus. It is a subspecies of the topi.

Range and distribution
Coastal topi occur in Kenya in the Lamu, Garissa and Tana River districts. They were formerly found in southern Somalia in riverine grasslands on the lower Shebelle and Juba Rivers and around Lake Badana; no current information is available on these populations. In 1999, the total population was assessed at ~100,000 individuals.

References

coastal topi
Mammals of Kenya
Fauna of East Africa
coastal topi
Bovids of Africa